The Supreme Tribunal of the Apostolic Signatura is the highest judicial authority in the Catholic Church (apart from the pope himself, who as supreme ecclesiastical judge is the final point of appeal for any ecclesiastical judgment). In addition, it oversees the administration of justice in the church.

Since 8 November 2014, the prefect of the Supreme Tribunal of the Apostolic Signatura has been Cardinal Dominique Mamberti. Its secretary since 26 January 2022 has been Bishop elect Andrea Ripa.

The Supreme Tribunal of the Apostolic Signatura is housed in the Italian Renaissance-era Palazzo della Cancelleria in Rome, Italy, which also is the headquarters and meeting place of the Roman Catholic Church's other two Tribunals. The Apostolic Signatura only hears appeals from these two tribunals (which normally have final and universal [worldwide Church] appellate jurisdiction over their respective areas of competence) if some process was in error or there is an inter-agency conflict, and usually not in regard to the judgment which was made or the merits of the case. The two other Tribunals located there are the Sacred Roman Rota (which is normally the final appellate tribunal of the church for most court cases, especially regarding marriage nullity, decisions of bishops, and ecclesiastical trials and disciplinary procedures), and the Apostolic Penitentiary (which is normally the final appellate tribunal regarding all matters having to do with the forgiveness of sins and the proper celebration of the Sacrament of Reconciliation).

Field of competence

The Roman Rota is the ordinary appellate tribunal of the Apostolic See. The Signatura's competence covers:
 complaints of nullity and petitions for total reinstatement against sentences of the Roman Rota; 
 recourses, in cases concerning the status of persons, when the Roman Rota has denied a new examination of the case; 
 exceptions of suspicion and other proceedings against judges of the Roman Rota arising from the exercise of their functions; 
 conflicts of competence between tribunals which are not subject to the same appellate tribunal.

Apart from these judicial matters, the Signatura has the competence as an administrative tribunal to deal with controversies over administrative decisions made by or approved by dicasteries of the Roman Curia if it is contended that the decision violated some law, either in the decision-making process or in the procedure used. It can also deal with administrative controversies referred to it by the Pope or those departments, and with conflicts of competence between the departments.

A third field of competence for the Signatura is that of overseeing all the tribunals of the Catholic Church, with power to extend the competence (jurisdiction) of tribunals, grant dispensations from procedural laws, establish inter diocesan tribunals, and discipline canonical advocates.

The Apostolic Signatura is also the final court of cassation in the civil legal system of Vatican City State. According to Vatican City State Law CCCLI issued on 16 March 2020, its competence includes appeals concerning legal procedure and judicial competence. According to a 2008 law issued by Pope Benedict XVI, the civil legal system of Vatican City State recognizes canon law as its first source of norms and first principle of interpretation. Pope Francis has stated that principles of canon law are essential to the interpretation and application of the laws of Vatican City State.

History
In the thirteenth century the Popes made use of "referendarii" to investigate and prepare the signing – hence the name signatura – of petitions and other cases presented to the Holy See. Pope Eugene IV entrusted these referendaries with authority to sign certain petitions and thereby established a permanent office for this purpose. Under Popes Alexander VI, Sixtus IV and Julius II this office was divided into two, the Signatura gratiae for examining petitions for favours, and the Signatura iustitiae for contentious cases. The honourable office of referendary came to be conferred frequently as a merely honorary title, but Pope Sixtus V put a limit on their number, and Pope Alexander VII combined the limited number of voting referendaries into a college, assisted by the simple referendaries, who had only a consultative position. The Signatura gratiae gradually lost its functions to other bodies, and the growth of the work of the Roman Rota, the foundation of the Congregations of Cardinals resulted in the Signatura iustitiae becoming mainly a Supreme Court of the Papal States.

On 29 June 1908, Pope Pius X reestablished a single Apostolic Signatura consisting of six cardinals, one of whom acted as its prefect. On 28 June 1915, Pope Benedict XV reconstituted the college of the voting referendaries and simple referendaries with consultative functions and the 1917 Code of Canon Law removed the limitation of the number of cardinals members of this Supreme Tribunal.

The present competence of the Apostolic Signatura is that laid down in the apostolic constitution Pastor Bonus of 28 June 1988.

On 16 March 2020, Pope Francis issued a new Vatican City civil law which makes the Apostolic Signatura itself the final court of cassation for Vatican City State and provides for greater independence of judicial bodies and magistrates dependent on the Pope. It also specifies the requirements for the appointment of judges and it simplifies the judicial system while increasing the staff of the court. Prior to that, the Cardinal Prefect of the Apostolic Signatura had served ex officio as the President of the Supreme Court of Vatican City (Corte di Cassazione). The two other members of the Supreme Court were also Cardinals of the Apostolic Signatura and were chosen by the Cardinal Prefect on a yearly basis.

Prefects since 1908
Vincenzo Vannutelli (20 October 1908 – 15 December 1914)
Michele Lega (15 December 1914 – 20 March 1920)
Augusto Silj (20 March 1920 – 26 February 1926)
Francesco Ragonesi (9 March 1926 – 14 September 1931)
Bonaventura Cerretti (12 October  1931 – 8 May 1933)
Enrico Gasparri (18 May 1933 – 20 May 1946)
Massimo Massimi (29 May 1946 – 6 March 1954)
Giuseppe Bruno (20 March 1954 – 10 November 1954)
Gaetano Cicognani (18 November 1954 – 5 February 1962)
Francesco Roberti (14 November 1959 – 24 March 1969)
Dino Staffa (7 April 1967 – 7 August 1977)
Pericle Felici (13 September 1977 – 22 March 1982)
Aurelio Sabattani (17 May 1982 – 1 July 1988)
Achille Silvestrini (1 July 1988 – 24 May 1991)
Gilberto Agustoni (2 April 1992 – 5 October 1998)
Zenon Grocholewski (5 October 1998 – 15 November 1999)
Mario Francesco Pompedda (15 November 1999 – 27 May 2004)
Agostino Vallini (27 May 2004 – 27 June 2008)
Raymond Leo Burke (27 June 2008 – 8 November 2014)
Dominique Mamberti (8 November 2014 – present)

References

External links
GCatholic.org

 
Tribunals of the Roman Curia